John Adams Parker (29 November 1829 – 1905) was a New York painter.

Biography
Parker was born in New York City. He received his education at New York University, and was a merchant from 1850 until 1857. He then studied art, exhibiting first at the Academy of Design in 1858, where he became a regular contributor. He was made an associate of the Academy in 1869, and was a member of the Brooklyn Art Association and one of the founders of the Brooklyn Art Club. He began his residence in Brooklyn in 1856.

Works
Mountain scenery especially claimed his attention, and the Adirondacks, the Catskills, and the White Mountains furnished him with most of the subjects for his paintings, which include:
“Twilight in the Adirondacks” (1876)
“Winter” (1879)
“Winter Twilight” (1880)
“Landscape in the Adirondacks — Twilight” (1882)
“Winter Evening” (1884)
“The Gothics — Adirondacks ” (1885)
“Close of a November Day, Ausable Pond, Adirondacks” (1886)

Notes

References

External links
Artwork by John Adams Parker

American landscape painters
People from Brooklyn
New York University alumni
1829 births
1905 deaths
19th-century American painters
19th-century American male artists
American male painters